Hazrat Nizamuddin–Rani Kamalapati Express (also Shaan-e-Bhopal) is a daily Superfast train service, connecting Bhopal, the capital of Madhya Pradesh, India and New Delhi.  It has the distinction of being the fastest 'non-Shatabdi', 'non-Rajdhani' and 'non-Sampark Kranti' train in India. The Shaan–E–Bhopal Express is the prestigious, one of the "first" ISO 9002 certified train of India, having high security features and high priority on the Indian Railways.

It covers the distance of 702 kilometres between Rani Kamalapati railway station and Hazrat Nizamuddin railway station in Delhi in nine hours and twenty minutes (9 hours 20 minutes) and in return journey covers the same distance in 9 hours 40 minutes (9 hours 40 mins). Due to its convenient timings, it is a highly preferred train for passengers commuting to and from Bhopal and Nizamuddin (Delhi).

Journey

Train no 12155 (Down) departs Rani Kamalapati, Bhopal and reaches Hazrat Nizamuddin, New Delhi the following morning.

The return journey train 12156 (Up) departs Hazrat Nizamuddin, New Delhi and reaches Rani Kamalapati, Bhopal the following morning. The train travels 702 km from Hazrat Nizamuddin, New Delhi to Rani Kamalapati, Bhopal

Traction
As the route is fully electrified,  it is hauled by a Tughlakabad-based WAP-7 locomotive end to end.

Features

The train is hauled by a Tuglakabad WAP-7 locomotive. Bhopal Express is India's first ISO 9000-2001 certified train.

Its AC First Class, AC 2-tier, AC 3-tier coach as well as the Sleeper coaches are GPS enabled and provide information such as current train speed, distance to final destination, distance to next stop, stoppage station name and timing performance on an LCD display. The train also has special facility of mini pantry and library for the people and is beautifully decorated with photos of heritage sites and also has coach fresheners. The train is very well known for its punctuality, speed and maintenance.

Coach composition

Loco HCP SLR  GS GS S12 S11 S10 S9 S8 S7 S6 S5 S4 S3 S2 S1 B4 B3 B2 B1 A2 A1 H1 GS GS SLR

References

External links 

Named passenger trains of India
Rail transport in Madhya Pradesh
Railway services introduced in 1997
Rail transport in Uttar Pradesh
Transport in Delhi
Express trains in India
Transport in Bhopal